TV Brasil Internacional is an international television station based in the city of the Rio de Janeiro in Brazil and also via Maputo in Mozambique. It broadcasts in the Portuguese language and was launched on 24 May 2010.

Initially it is scheduled to broadcast to 49 African nations. There are plans then to roll it out in Latin America, North America, Caribbean, Europe, Arab world, South Asia, Asia Pacific and Australia.

Launch
Luiz Inácio Lula da Silva, President of Brazil, launched the television station on 24 May 2010 at a ceremony in Itamaraty Palace in Brasília where the Foreign Affairs Ministry is based. He portrayed the aim of the project as "presenting Brazil to the world. He called it as "the realisation of a dream [...] I don't want a TV channel to speak well of Lula. I want a channel that speaks well of the country, that can show Brazil as it really is". He also said: "We want a network that talks about politics in quality terms, leaving aside prejudices because this will be a public network showing how Brazilians are beyond our borders".

The BBC's Americas editor James Read said it "shows Brazil's growing interest in Africa".

President of Mozambique Armando Emilio Guebuza said TV Brasil Internacional would "enrich communication between Brazil and Africa" in his remarks that were recorded prior to the ceremony's occurrence.

Audience
Among the countries in Africa to avail themselves of TV Brasil Internacional are those that speak the Portuguese language: Angola, Cape Verde, Guinea-Bissau, Mozambique and São Tomé and Príncipe. Luiz Inácio Lula da Silva has made several visits to the African continent and expressed interest in the promotion of Afro-Brazilian bilateral ties. Brazilian football and soap operas are keenly followed by the inhabitants of Portuguese-speaking Africa. The government of Brazil agreed to a deal with Africa's pay TV operator MultiChoice for signal distribution. TV Brasil Internacional's target audience also includes around three million Brazilians who are outside Brazil.

Programming
TV Brasil broadcasts its programming on TV Brasil Internacional, focusing on news and culture topics.

References

External links

TV Brasil Internacional at LyngSat Address

Empresa Brasil de Comunicação
Television networks in Brazil
Television channels and stations established in 2010
Portuguese-language television stations in Brazil
TV Brasil
Publicly funded broadcasters
International broadcasters
Mass media in Brasília
State media
Companies based in Brasília
Companies based in Rio de Janeiro (city)

de:TV Brasil Internacional